Ivan Lam Long-yin (born 18 July 1994) is a student who together with Joshua Wong established the Hong Kong student activist group, Scholarism, in May 2011. In 2018, he replaced Nathan Law as the chairperson of Demosisto. In December 2020, Lam was sentenced to seven months in prison for his role during the 2019 protests. Along with him, activists Joshua Wong and Agnes Chow were also convicted. On 12 April 2021, he was released from prison.

References 

Living people
1994 births
Hong Kong democracy activists
Demosistō politicians
Prisoners and detainees of Hong Kong
Hong Kong political prisoners